Joseph Emberton (23 December 1889 – 20 November 1956) was an English architect of the early modernist period. He was born 23 December 1889 in Audley, Staffordshire and was educated at the Royal College of Art. He first worked for the London architects Trehearne and Norman between 1913 and 1914, before serving as a gunner in the Honourable Artillery Company during the First World War.

In 1923 he designed Olympia National, then known as the New Hall. This sat alongside Olympia Grand at the Kensington event venue. 1932 saw the construction of his second addition to Olympia – Olympia Central (initially named the Empire Hall). These halls, along with other event spaces, all make up one of London's largest event venues – Olympia London.

His 1931 design of the Royal Corinthian Yacht Club at Burnham-on-Crouch represented Britain at the influential International Exhibition of Modern Architecture held at Museum of Modern Art in New York City in 1932. He went on to design the Simpsons of Piccadilly department store in 1936 with the interior designed by László Moholy-Nagy, and the Casino at Blackpool's pleasure beach in 1939. Emberton's archive is located at the University of Brighton Design Archives.

Emberton married Kathleen Marie (née Chantrey; b. 1906/7), who was the daughter of the chartered accountant, William Herbert Chantrey. The couple had two daughters.

He died in London on 20 November 1956.

Notes

References
 Anthony Sutcliffe (2006). London: An Architectural History. Yale University Press. .

External links

 Joseph Emberton's family films at Screen Archive South East.
 Images of flats in London designed by Emberton
 Joseph Emberton Archive, University of Brighton Design Archives

1889 births
1956 deaths
Alumni of the Royal College of Art
British Army personnel of World War I
20th-century English architects
Honourable Artillery Company soldiers
Architects from Staffordshire
People from Audley, Staffordshire